Scott Gruhl (born September 13, 1959) is a Canadian former professional ice hockey player.

Gruhl was born in Port Colborne, Ontario. He played two years with Northeastern University, before joining the Sudbury Wolves for the 1978–79 season.

Gruhl turned professional in 1979 with the Saginaw Gears, after a tryout with the Binghamton Dusters. He would play until 1996 with various minor league professional teams. He earned two callups to the Los Angeles Kings and one with the Pittsburgh Penguins during his career.

Career statistics

Awards
IHL Second All-Star Team (1980, 1986, 1992)
IHL First All-Star Team (1984, 1985)
James Gatschene Memorial Trophy (MVP - IHL) (1985)

External links
 

1959 births
Living people
Baltimore Bandits players
Binghamton Dusters players
Canadian expatriate ice hockey players in the United States
Canadian ice hockey left wingers
Fort Wayne Komets players
Houston Apollos players
Ice hockey people from Ontario
New Haven Nighthawks players
Kalamazoo Wings (1974–2000) players
Los Angeles Kings players
Milwaukee Admirals (IHL) players
Muskegon Lumberjacks players
Muskegon Mohawks players
Northeastern Huskies men's ice hockey players
People from Port Colborne
Pittsburgh Penguins players
Richmond Renegades players
Saginaw Gears players
San Diego Barracudas players
Sudbury Wolves players
Undrafted National Hockey League players